The Eleventh Hour is a 1923 American action film directed by Bernard Durning and written by Louis Sherwin. The film stars Shirley Mason, Buck Jones, Richard Tucker, Alan Hale Sr., Walter McGrail and June Elvidge. The film was released on July 20, 1923, by Fox Film Corporation.

Between February 26 and March 2, 1923, Twentieth Century Fox used the United States Navy submarine  in filming The Eleventh Hour.

Cast             
Shirley Mason as Barbara Hackett
Buck Jones as Brick McDonald 
Richard Tucker as Herbert Glenville
Alan Hale Sr. as Prince Stefan de Bernie
Walter McGrail as Dick Manley
June Elvidge as Estelle Hackett
Fred Kelsey as The Submarine Commander
Nigel De Brulier as Mordecai Newman
Fred Kohler as Barbara's Uncle

References

External links
 

1923 films
American action films
1920s action films
Fox Film films
Films directed by Bernard Durning
American silent feature films
American black-and-white films
1920s American films
English-language action films
1920s English-language films